Galah Chah (also Romanized as Galah Chāh) is a village in Dust Mohammad Rural District, in the Central District of Hirmand County, Sistan and Baluchestan Province, Iran. At the 2006 census, its population was 590, in 124 families.

References 

Populated places in Hirmand County